The , also known as the New Harbinger Party, was a political party in Japan that broke away from the Liberal Democratic Party (LDP) on 22 June 1993.  The party was created by Masayoshi Takemura. The party was centrist, and had many reformist and even moderate ecological elements. The theoretical leader was Shusei Tanaka. Yukio Hatoyama and Naoto Kan also took part but later moved to the Democratic Party of Japan.

History
After the 1993 general election, Sakigake joined a Cabinet led by Morihiro Hosokawa. It was the first government without the LDP since 1955. Sakigake's Masayoshi Takemura became Minister. Sakigake supported the following Tsutomu Hata Cabinet, but didn't join the Cabinet.

In 1994, New Party Sakigake took part in the government of Murayama Tomiichi, a government coalition of the LDP and the Japan Socialist Party, which replaced the coalition government headed the previous year by the Japan Renewal Party.

In September 1996, Sakigake and Japan Socialist Party politicians who did not support their respective parties alliances with the LDP broke away to found the Democratic Party of Japan.

The exodus of these liberal members moved the party further to the right. In 1997, the New Party Sakigake had two members in the House of Representatives and three members in the House of Councillors, which was good for them, especially after the LDP became the ruling party again. However, it decided to moderate its stance, and, because of the power of the ecologist and reformist factions, the conservatives decided to reform the party. As part of the ruling coalition in 1998, it had 2 seats in the House of Representatives and 3 in the House of Councillors. In October 1998, the party reformed itself with a more conservative image, dropping the 'New' from its title to become simply the Sakigake Party.

Its popularity heavily declined after that, and by 2001, the party had no seats in either the Lower or Upper House. In 2002, the ecologists took control, and turned the party into an ecologist party.

The party gained its followers mainly from white collar bureaucrats and ecologists. It was a conservative reformist party with ecological elements.

List of leaders of NPS

Election results

House of Representatives

House of Councillors

See also 

Politics of Japan
List of political parties in Japan
Timeline of liberal parties in Japan

Notes

References

External links
Archive.org copy of former website

Liberal parties in Japan
Centrist parties in Japan
Centre-left parties in Asia
Conservative liberal parties
Defunct political parties in Japan
Environmentalism in Japan
Political parties established in 1993
1993 establishments in Japan